The Love in Your Eyes may refer to:

The Love in Your Eyes (Cats album), or the album's title track
"The Love in Your Eyes" (Eddie Money song)
"The Love in Your Eyes" (Dan Hartman song)
The Love in Your Eyes (TV series), a South Korean series

See also
"Amor en Tus Ojos" (English: "Love in Your Eyes"), a 1996 song by Soraya